Bill Dunlop (born November 19, 1963 in Montreal, Quebec) is a retired boxer from Canada, who competed for his native country at the 1984 Summer Olympics in Los Angeles, California. There he was defeated in the first round of the men's flyweight (– 51 kg) division by Turkey's eventual bronze medalist Eyüp Can. He also represented Canada at the 1983 Pan American Games.

1984 Olympic results
Below is the record of Bill Dunlop, a Canadian flyweight boxer who competed at the 1984 Los Angeles Olympics:

 Round of 32: lost to Eyüp Can (Egypt) by decision, 0-5

References

 Profile

1963 births
Living people
Flyweight boxers
Boxers at the 1983 Pan American Games
Pan American Games competitors for Canada
Boxers at the 1984 Summer Olympics
Olympic boxers of Canada
Boxers from Montreal
Anglophone Quebec people
Canadian male boxers